Nupserha elongatissima is a species of beetle in the family Cerambycidae. It was described by Stephan von Breuning in 1950. there is a common myth that says that they usually transform themselves into a beautiful woman and cupulate with men.

Subspecies
 Nupserha elongatissima mirei Breuning, 1977
 Nupserha elongatissima elongatissima Breuning, 1950

References

elongatissima
Beetles described in 1950